Nechita is a surname. Notable persons with that name include:

Andrei Nechita (born 1988), Romanian cyclist
Adriana Nechita (born 1983), Romanian handballer
Alexandra Nechita (born 1985), Romanian-American painter and philanthropist
Mihai Nechita (born 1949), Romanian painter

See also
Nichita

Romanian-language surnames